Joshua Darren Hare (born 12 August 1994) is an English professional footballer who plays as a defender for Dagenham & Redbridge.

Career
Hare signed his first professional contract with Gillingham in November 2012. He signed a one-year contract with the "Gills" in May 2014, but found first-team football hard to come by and was sent on an initial one-month loan to Conference South side Eastbourne Borough. His loan was extended to 10 January but on 5 January the loan was cut short.

On 8 July 2016, having left Gillingham, Hare signed for Eastbourne Borough.

Bristol Rovers
On 12 June 2019, Hare signed for Bristol Rovers on a free transfer following the expiry of his contract at Eastleigh.

After making an impressive start to the season, Hare suffered an injury and had to be stretchered off in a league match against Gillingham on 17 September. He returned to first-team action on 7 March 2020 in a 3–1 defeat to Southend United and featured three days later in a 2–0 win against Sunderland, the last match before the league's abandonment.

He scored his first goal for the club on 18 November 2020, scoring a 90th-minute winner in a 4–3 victory over Chelsea U21 in the final match of the group stage of the EFL Trophy, with Hare's goal seeing the Gas qualify for the knockout stages.

At the end of the 2020–21 season, a season that saw the Gas relegated bottom of the league, Hare was announced to be one of the players to not be having his contract renewed.

Eastleigh
On 29 June 2021, Hare returned to National League side Eastleigh on a permanent deal. On 14 September, he scored his first goal back at the club with the fourth in a 4–1 thrashing of Dover Athletic having already set up his side's second goal.

Dagenham & Redbridge
On 19 February 2022, he signed for National League divisional rivals Dagenham & Redbridge for an undisclosed fee. Manager Daryl McMahon stated that Hare was "a player that I’ve admired for a long time".

Personal life
Hare is the son of former Gillingham youth team manager Darren Hare, the nephew of former Gillingham player and manager Andy Hessenthaler, and the cousin of another former Gills player, Jake Hessenthaler.

Career statistics

Honours
Individual
National League Team of the Year: 2018–19

References

External links

1994 births
Living people
Sportspeople from Canterbury
Footballers from Kent
English footballers
Association football defenders
Association football midfielders
Gillingham F.C. players
Eastbourne Borough F.C. players
Leatherhead F.C. players
Maidstone United F.C. players
Eastleigh F.C. players
Bristol Rovers F.C. players
Dagenham & Redbridge F.C. players
English Football League players
National League (English football) players
Isthmian League players